is another home for Takarazuka Creative Arts in Yurakucho, Chiyoda ward, Tokyo.

It served as the second round performing theater for the Revue's performing cycle. The original theater was built in 1934. It was taken over by the American GHQ after the defeat of Japan in 1945 and renamed the "Ernie Pyle Theater" from 1945–55. It was demolished in 1998. The current theater was built in 2001. It has 1,229 seats on the first level and 840 on the second.

References

External links 
 Tarakazuka Revue official website

Toho
Theatres in Tokyo
Tokyo Takarazuka Theater
Theatres completed in 1934
1934 establishments in Japan
Buildings and structures in Chiyoda, Tokyo